Javier "Javi" Moreno Sánchez (born 20 June 1997) is a Spanish professional footballer who plays as a left winger for Polish club ŁKS Łódź.

Club career
Born in Almería, Andalusia, Moreno started his career with CD Oriente, and subsequently represented Los Molinos CF and La Cañada Atlético CF. In July 2014 he returned to Los Molinos, and made his first-team debut on 23 August by starting in a 0–1 Tercera División home loss against UD San Pedro.

In January 2015, after three appearances with the main squad, Moreno signed for UD Almería and returned to youth football. He first appeared with the reserves on 20 December 2015, coming on as a half-time substitute for Kiu in a 1–3 away loss against Real Betis B in the Segunda División B.

On 28 August 2016 Moreno scored his first senior goal, netting his team's second in a 4–1 home routing of CD Alhaurino. The following 29 March, he suffered a serious knee injury and remained sidelined for seven months.

On 21 August 2019, Moreno signed for UCAM Murcia CF in the third level. On 8 June 2021, he moved abroad for the first time in his career after agreeing to a contract with Polish I liga side ŁKS Łódź.

Moreno made his professional debut on 30 July 2021, starting in a 1–1 away draw against GKS Tychy.

References

External links
 
 
 
 
 

1997 births
Living people
Footballers from Almería
Spanish footballers
Association football wingers
Segunda División B players
Tercera División players
UD Almería B players
UD Almería players
UCAM Murcia CF players
I liga players
ŁKS Łódź players
Spanish expatriate footballers
Spanish expatriate sportspeople in Poland
Expatriate footballers in Poland